Joe McDoakes is an American short film comedy series produced and directed by Richard L. Bare for Warner Bros. A total of 63 black and white live action one-reel short subjects films were made and released between 1942 and 1956. The Joe McDoakes shorts are also known as the Behind the Eight Ball (for the large eight ball Joe appeared behind in the opening credits) or the So You Want... series (as the film titles began with this phrase). The character's name comes from "Joe Doakes," which was then a popular American slang term for the average man.

The theme song of the series is "I Know that You Know" (music by Vincent Youmans) from his Broadway musical Oh, Please! (1926), used later in the MGM musical Hit the Deck (1955).

George O'Hanlon, who would later provide the voice of George Jetson in Hanna-Barbera's animated sitcom The Jetsons, starred as the series' title character, Joe McDoakes. These one-reel shorts were co-written by Bare and O'Hanlon, although Bare usually received sole screen credit as writer. Art Gilmore, through 1948, served as the narrator of Joe's humorous efforts to accomplish the activity that was the focus of the short. Gordon Hollingshead, who won five Academy Awards for producing other short subjects for Warner Bros., was also credited as a producer on the series until his death in 1952, although his role on this series was primarily as liaison between the studio and the director.

History
The series began with So You Want to Give Up Smoking, made as a project by Bare to teach his students at the University of Southern California the fundamentals of making a movie. It was picked up by Warner Bros. for $2500 and became the first of a series of short subjects. Only one more short was produced before World War II caused the series to be suspended, but production resumed in 1945 with So You Think You're Allergic.

These first three shorts were filmed silent, with narration added in post-production, in the manner of the popular Pete Smith shorts, made at MGM from 1931 to 1955. They also resembled the Smith shorts in that they addressed actual, everyday problems (giving up smoking, caring for the eyes, coping with allergies) in an instructional but humorous way.

In 1946 the series began using live sound recording, and the addition of dialogue gave the films a new dimension. Now the action was being played strictly for laughs, with many familiar character actors adding to the fun. Fritz Feld, Ralph Sanford, Philip Van Zandt, Fred Kelsey, and Leo White made frequent appearances; semi-regulars were Clifton Young and later Del Moore as Joe's loudmouthed pal Homer, Rodney Bell as dumb-bell "helper" Marvin, and Ted Stanhope as an all-purpose authority figure (desk clerk, salesman, businessman, etc.). Many of the shorts are domestic comedies, with "the original hard-luck kid" McDoakes insisting on carrying a project through, with often disastrous consequences. So You Want a Model Railroad has Joe so engrossed in the hobby that it overruns his entire apartment; So You Want to Be a Cowboy has Joe going to a movie, and creating a disturbance when he envisions himself as a cowboy hero; So You're Going on a Vacation has Joe struggling with a camping outfit.

Warner contract player Jane Harker co-starred as Joe's wife, Alice, in eight comedies, beginning with So You Want to Play the Horses in 1946 and ending with So You Want to Build a House in 1948. Screen newcomer Phyllis Coates took over the role in So You Want to Be in Politics. Coates had married producer/director Bare that same year; the working relationship between Coates and Bare would survive their divorce. Former singing star Jane Frazee assumed the role beginning with So You Want to Be Your Own Boss (1954), but Coates returned in 1956 for the last three installments. Harker, Coates, and Frazee each displayed a fine sense of comedy as Joe's long-suffering mate. While the Little Alice character would appear in most of the shorts, the actress playing her would not be billed, and unless the story required Joe to be married, not only would Alice not appear, but Joe could even be a bachelor again, as there was no continuity between installments.

Star O'Hanlon and director Bare shared the same crazy sense of humor, which ran all through the series. So You Want to Be a Detective pokes fun at the detective mystery Lady in the Lake; the action is in the first person, with the camera representing Art Gilmore (taking a more active role in the story than usual), who is presumably tagging along with Joe. In So You Want to Be in Pictures, McDoakes is listening to a record that is providing an acting lesson, and when the telephone rings the record tells him to answer it. Later in that same short, McDoakes is hired to serve as a stunt double at a movie studio. The job turns out to be a George O'Hanlon comedy (the clapper board identifies it as So You Want to Hold Your Wife), and Joe takes a pie in the face from Jane Harker! So You Want to Know Your Relatives turns into a wicked satire of This Is Your Life, with Joe as the reluctant guest of honor. Joe occasionally punctuates the end of a scene by looking straight into the camera to speak to (or commiserate with) the movie audience.

The series hit its stride in the late 1940s, gaining three consecutive Academy Award nominations in the category of Short Subjects, one-reel for So You Want to Be in Pictures (1947), So You Want to Be on the Radio (1948), and So You Think You're Not Guilty (1949). For most of the series's run, the McDoakes shorts were the only live-action comedies offered in the 10-minute length, making them handy for theater owners to include in their programs. The series ran until 1956, when the decline of the studio system brought an end to the production of short subjects by Warner Bros. and most of the other Hollywood studios.

Cast and crew
Note: Appearance credits for non-billed actors may be incomplete or incorrect due to inaccurate sources.

Billed cast and crew
 George O'Hanlon - Joe McDoakes
 Art Gilmore - Narrator (1942, 1946–1950)
Knox Manning - Narrator (1945)
 Richard Bare - Director/Producer
 Gordon Hollingshead - Producer (1942-1953)

Alice McDoakes
 Jane Harker (1946–1948)
 Phyllis Coates (1948–1953, 1956)
 Jane Frazee (1954–1955)

Character actors with 10 or more appearances
 Rodney Bell
 Fred Kelsey
 Ted Stanhope
 Clifton Young

Guest cast notable for other roles
 Arthur Q. Bryan, the voice of Elmer Fudd, appeared on screen in So You Want a Model Railroad and So You Want to Be a Paper Hanger and filled in for Art Gilmore as the narrator in So You Want to Be a Policeman.
 George Chandler and Ronald Reagan, both of whom would later be President of the Screen Actors Guild (SAG), appeared in the same short, So You Want to Be in Pictures.
 Iron Eyes Cody offered a "scalp" treatment to Joe in So You Want to Keep Your Hair.
 The screen duo of Doris Day and Gordon MacRae has a cameo in So You Want a Television Set.
 Charlie Hall, who served as the foil in many Laurel and Hardy shorts, had his last screen appearance in So You Want to Play the Piano.
 Lyle Talbot, a founding member of SAG, was in So You Want to Be Your Own Boss.
 Frank Nelson, frequent guest star on The Jack Benny Program and I Love Lucy, appeared in So You're Going to Have an Operation, So You Want to Be an Actor, and So You Want to Know Your Relatives.

Shorts

Home video availability

Warner Bros. has released the entire series of 63 shorts in the DVD-R format, as The Joe McDoakes Collection. Individual shorts can also be found as extras on DVDs of classic Warner Bros. films of the period:

 So You Want to Give Up Smoking is on the DVD of All Through the Night.
 So You Think You Need Glasses is on the DVD of The Man Who Came to Dinner
 So You Think You're Allergic is on the DVD of Objective, Burma!
 So You Think You're a Nervous Wreck is on the DVD of A Night in Casablanca.
 So You Want to Be in Pictures is on the DVD of The Hasty Heart
 So You Want to Be a Detective is on the DVD of The Treasure of the Sierra Madre.
 So You Want to Be on the Radio is on the DVD of Adventures of Don Juan.
 So You Want to Be an Actor is on the DVD of My Dream Is Yours
 So You Think You're Not Guilty is on the DVD of White Heat.
 So You Want to Hold Your Husband is on the DVD of Tea for Two
 So You Want to Move is on the DVD of Rocky Mountain
 So You Want a Raise is on the DVD of Montana
 So You're Going to Have an Operation is on the DVD of The Flame and the Arrow
 So You Want to Be a Paper Hanger is on the DVD of Jim Thorpe - All-American
 So You Want to Be a Bachelor is on the DVD of Starlift
 So You Want to Enjoy Life is on the DVD of Big Jim McLain
 So You Want to Wear the Pants is on the DVD of April in Paris
 So You Want to Learn to Dance and So You Want a Television Set are on the DVD of By the Light of the Silvery Moon.
 So You Love Your Dog is on the DVD of Calamity Jane
 So You Think You Can't Sleep is on the DVD of Trouble Along the Way
 So You Want to Be an Heir is on the DVD of South Sea Woman
 So You Want to Know Your Relatives is on the DVD of His Majesty O'Keefe
 So Your Wife Wants to Work is on the DVD of The Spirit of St. Louis.

See also

Notes

References
 Liebman, Roy Vitaphone Films – A Catalogue of the Features and Shorts, McFarland & Company, 2003.
 Maltin, Leonard The Great Movie Shorts, Bonanza Books, 1972.

External links
 Review of The Joe McDoakes Collection at DVD Talk
 Appreciation and review by Leonard Maltin

Short film series
Warner Bros. short films
Vitaphone short films
Comedy film series